Steaua Rangers are a Romanian ice hockey team that currently plays in the Romanian Hockey League. They play their home games at Mihai Flamaropol.

History
The hockey team was founded in 1951 as CCA București and existed alongside other sections (e.g., football, handball, basketball) in the Steaua București sports club. In 1961, their name was changed to CSA Steaua București. With 40 championship titles and 31 cup victories, Steaua is the most successful ice hockey team in Romania. They last won the Championship in 2006, and the Cup in 2008.

In 2008, Steaua joined the MOL Liga along with CS Progym Gheorgheni in addition to the Romanian Hockey League. They finished in sixth place out of ten participants. Steaua did not return to the league in 2009-10, due to financial issues.

The team plays in the 2022/23 season.

Achievements
Campionatul Național:
Winners (40): 1953, 1955, 1956, 1958, 1959, 1961, 1962, 1964, 1965, 1966, 1967, 1969, 1970, 1974, 1975, 1977, 1978, 1980, 1982, 1983, 1984, 1985, 1986, 1987, 1988, 1989, 1990, 1991, 1992, 1993, 1994, 1995, 1996, 1998, 1999, 2001, 2002, 2003, 2005, 2006
Cupa României
Winners (33): 1969, 1973, 1974, 1975, 1976, 1977, 1978, 1980, 1981, 1982, 1984, 1985, 1986, 1987, 1989, 1990-spring, 1990-autumn, 1991, 1992, 1993, 1994, 1995, 1996, 1998-spring, 1998-autumn, 1999, 2000, 2002, 2004, 2005, 2008, 2011-autumn, 2012

Known players
Players known to have joined this team is current forward and San Jose draft pick Cam Severson and former retired NHL goaltender Artūrs Irbe.

Notes

External links
 Official CSA Steaua website
 Club website
 Official website

 
Ice hockey teams in Romania
Ice hockey
Erste Liga (ice hockey) teams
Ice hockey clubs established in 1951
1951 establishments in Romania